Ilija Bozoljac and Daniele Bracciali were the defending champions; however, they decided not to compete.
Alessio di Mauro and Simone Vagnozzi won the tournament after defeating Evgeny Korolev and Yuri Schukin 6–4, 6–4 in the final.

Seeds

Draw

Draw

References
 Main draw

2011 Doubles
Rabat,Doubles